Sun Chanthol (born 30 June 1956) is a Cambodian politician and the current Minister for Public Works and Transport, a post he previously held from 2004 to 2008. He was formerly Minister for Commerce from 2013 to 2016. 

Previously he was the Senior Minister and Vice Chairman of Council for the Development of Cambodia (CDC).  He was elected to represent Kandal Province in the National Assembly of Cambodia in 2003.

Sun Chanthol was the Minister of Public Works and Transport from 2004 to 2008, and again from 2016. 

He was President of SC Investment Co., Ltd and served as the Economic and Finance Advisor to the President of the National Assembly from 1999 to 2003.

He served as Secretary of State for Economy and Finance and a Secretary General of the CDC from 1994 to 1997.

Chanthol worked for General Electric Company for 16 years and held various senior executive positions in General Management and Finance functions both in the United States and in Asia. He started his career with G.E. as a management trainee and worked his way up to senior international management.

He received his B.S. in Business Administration from The American University, an Advanced Management Program (AMP) from the Wharton School of the University of Pennsylvania and a Masters in Public Administration (MPA) from Harvard University.

Chanthol was elected as a Global Leader for Tomorrow of the World Economic Forum in 1995. He has been a member of the Wharton Executive Board for Asia since 2002 and was appointed as the first Chairman of the Wharton Executive Board for Asia in July 2009.

References

21st-century Cambodian politicians 
American people of Cambodian descent
Cambodian emigrants to the United States
Naturalized citizens of the United States
Members of the National Assembly (Cambodia)
Government ministers of Cambodia
Transport ministers
Trade ministers 
Living people
1956 births
Cambodian People's Party politicians
FUNCINPEC politicians 
Harvard Kennedy School alumni
People from Phnom Penh
Kogod School of Business alumni
Wharton School of the University of Pennsylvania alumni